This Is Your Life is the fourth studio album released from Gospel trio Out of Eden.

Track listing 
Different Now (Lisa Kimmey, Lee Jerkins, David Hackley)
Day Like Today (Lisa Kimmey, Donnie Scantz, Jamie Portee)
Paradise (Lisa Kimmey, Todd Collins)
Meditate (Lisa Kimmey, Nate "Love" Clemmons, "Big Mike" Clemmons, E. Roberson)
Now I Sing (Lisa Kimmey, Lee Jerkins, David Hackley)
Showpiece (Lisa Kimmey, A.J. Wolfe)
All You Need (Lee Jerkins, Lisa Kimmey, Lanette Stamper)
Praise You (Lisa Kimmey, Danielle Kimmey)
Rolling Stone (Lisa Kimmey)
This Is Your Life (Lisa Kimmey, Donnie Scantz, Jamie Portee)
I Am The One (Lisa Kimmey, Donnie Scantz, Jamie Portee)
Reprise (All You Need)

There are 2 versions of "Different Now"-the album version and a radio version which is available on the "WOW Hits 2002" compilation album. The radio version features a spoken intro over the trumpets at the beginning, while the album version has no speaking, only the trumpets.

If you rewind track 1 in your CD player approximately 1:20 back, you will hear a hidden intro by DJ Maj, discussing with group member Lisa Kimmey about the album.

Track 12, titled "Reprise" is simply a minute-and-a-half instrumental version of "All You Need".

Trivia
Los Angeles Angels first baseman Albert Pujols, a devout Christian, uses the group's song "Different Now" for his at-bat song.

Chart history

References

2002 albums
Out of Eden albums
Gotee Records albums